Lauren Alice Koslow (born March 9, 1953) is an American actress, best known for her long-running portrayal of Kate Roberts on the NBC dramatic serial Days of Our Lives, which she has played continuously since 1996. She previously appeared in the soaps The Bold and the Beautiful and The Young and the Restless.

Early life and education 
Koslow was born in Boston, where she spent the early years of her childhood.

Career
She began her acting career with touring theatre work in such productions as Cat on a Hot Tin Roof and Dial M for Murder.

Turning to television in the mid-1980s, Koslow was cast in the role of Lindsay Wells on the CBS soap opera The Young and the Restless, which she played from 1984 to 1986. She was then asked by the serial's creators William J. Bell and wife Lee Phillip Bell to become an original cast member on the duo's new sister soap The Bold and the Beautiful which debuted in the spring of 1987. She portrayed fashion designer Margo Lynley from the serial's inception until 1992, and later filmed a cameo flashback sequence as the character in 2002.

Through the early 1990s, Koslow busied had guest-starring roles in several prime time series, including Silk Stalkings and The Nanny. She returned to daytime television in 1996, replacing actress Deborah Adair on NBC soap Days of Our Lives, after Adair's departure from the series in February 1995.

Koslow assumed Adair's role of vindictive call girl turned corporate executive Kate Roberts on Days of Our Lives. The character is known for her wickedness and deception, specifically her ongoing war with fellow Salem resident Sami Brady (Alison Sweeney), the former ex-fiancé of Kate's son Austin (Austin Peck) and ex-fiancé/current ex-wife of her son Lucas (Bryan Dattilo), and numerous affairs and romantic entanglements. Other notable character conflicts include Kate's mysterious past with series villain Stefano DiMera (Joseph Mascolo), her rocky marriage with mogul Victor Kiriakis (John Aniston), and her rivalries with crazed socialite Vivian Alamain (Louise Sorel) and Nicole Walker DiMera.  Kate is the mother of Lucas Horton, Rex Brady, Cassie Brady, Philip Kiriakis, Billie Reed, and Austin Reed.
 
She remains a cast member of Days of Our Lives, celebrating her 25th anniversary portraying Kate in 2021.

Personal life 
Koslow married makeup artist Nicky Schillace in 1987. They have three children.

In October 2021, Koslow announced she was reunited with her firstborn son Josh, who she was separated from (through unknown circumstances) three days after his birth.

Filmography

Herself

Awards
In 2000 Koslow was nominated for a Soap Opera Digest Award as Outstanding Supporting Actress for her work on Days of Our Lives.
In 2009 Koslow was pre-nominated for a Daytime Emmy as Outstanding Lead Actress.

References

External links
 

1953 births
Living people
American soap opera actresses
American stage actresses
American LGBT rights activists
Actresses from Boston
Actresses from Greater Los Angeles
Actresses from Massachusetts
Virginia Tech alumni
University of Massachusetts Amherst alumni
Activists from California
21st-century American women